"Uprising" is a song by the English rock band Muse. It was released on 4 August 2009 as the lead single from the band's fifth studio album, The Resistance (2009). The song was written by band member Matt Bellamy, produced by the band, and mixed by Spike Stent. "Uprising" peaked at number 37 on the US Billboard Hot 100, and peaked in the top 10 in seven countries. It was certified platinum in the United Kingdom, gold in four countries, platinum in three countries, and double-platinum in the United States, making it Muse's best-selling single.

Composition
"Uprising" was described as an alternative rock and glam rock song. It is composed in the key of D minor with a tempo of 132 beats per minute. Several critics likened it to the theme music from the science fiction TV show Doctor Who.

Release
While "United States of Eurasia" was initially thought by the Muse fan community to be the first single due for release, Muse revealed, via their Twitter page, that it would in fact be "Uprising". It was revealed in July 2009 that the band would perform at the 2009 MTV Video Music Awards. They played at the theatre across the street from where the VMAs were held, and were introduced by Gerard Butler. On 28 July 2009, Zane Lowe played a 32-second sample on BBC Radio 1 ahead of its first play in full on 3 August 2009. The song peaked at number nine on the UK Singles Chart and is the band's fourth top 10 single on that chart.

"Uprising" won the Best Single award at the 2010 Music Producers Guild Awards in London.

Commercial performance
"Uprising" peaked in the top 10 in Belgium (Wallonia), Denmark, Finland, Norway, Scotland, Switzerland, and the United Kingdom. It was certified silver by the BPI in the United Kingdom, gold by the ARIA in Australia, BEA in Belgium, MC in Canada, and FIMI, platinum by SNEP in France and IFPI in Switzerland, and double-platinum by the RIAA in the United States.

After being released to radio in the United States, the single reached number one on the Billboard Alternative Songs chart on 9 September 2009, becoming Muse's sixth top 10 single and first number one on that chart, eventually spending 17 weeks at number one, becoming the second longest-running number one song ever on the chart (now third longest). It also became one of three songs at the time to almost concurrently break the 52-week record held by 30 Seconds to Mars' "The Kill", Red Jumpsuit Apparatus's "Face Down", and Finger Eleven's "Paralyzer". As songs on the chart are retired for charting out of the top 10 beyond week 52, it was initially removed for a week after logging its 52nd week for missing the top 10. However, the following week it gained enough points to return to the top 10, returning it to the chart for a 53rd week, which would mark its final tally. In 2013, it was ranked the top song of all time in the magazine's 25th anniversary list of the top 100 songs to grace the chart. It became Muse's first entry on the Billboard Hot 100 (and first top 40 single), peaking at number 37 on the week ending 3 October 2009 and spent 20 weeks on the Hot 100. It remains the band's only top 40 single. It has sold 2,170,000 copies in the US .

Music video
The music video, directed by American collective Hydra (Sam Stephens, John Hobbs and others), appeared on 4 August 2009. The band performs through a miniature city in the bed of an old, small truck, with a lit fuse following behind. At times, they are also seen performing inside a miniature airstream trailer, which seems to be exploding. Through the window of a store, the band at one point looks at TVs with teddy bears (with reptilian eyes, sharp claws, and fangs) on the screens; Matt smashes the window and TVs with his guitar. At the end of the video, a group of teddy bears, similarly looking to the teddy bears seen on the TVs, rise up from the ground and start destroying the miniature city, only to all fall down at the end of the video. This is said to pay homage to the climactic scene in Ghostbusters, with one shot even mirroring the Stay Puft Marshmallow Man's introduction.

The video won "Best Special Effects" in the 2010 MTV Video Music Awards, but lost "Best Rock Video" to Thirty Seconds to Mars' "Kings and Queens."

Personnel 
 Matthew Bellamy – lead vocals, guitars, keyboards
 Chris Wolstenholme – bass guitar, backing vocals
 Dominic Howard – drums, percussion
 Tom Kirk – handclaps, backing vocals
 Adrian Bushby – handclaps, backing vocals
 Paul Reeve – handclaps, backing vocals

Track listing

7-inch
Warner Bros. — WEA458

CD
Warner Bros. — WEA458CD

Download

Charts

Weekly charts

Year-end charts

Decade-end charts

Sales and certifications

References

External links

Official
"Uprising" (sound track), licensed by SpaceX for Reusable Launch System concept video, 3:58, 29 September 2011.

2009 singles
2009 songs
Albums with cover art by Storm Thorgerson
Anti-fascist music
Glam rock songs
Muse (band) songs
Protest songs
Songs about revolutions
Songs written by Matt Bellamy
Synth rock songs
Warner Records singles